Tom Gamble (born 7 November 2001) is a British racing driver who currently races for United Autosports in European Le Mans Series. He is a Ginetta Junior champion, a BRDC British Formula 3 race winner, and has previously competed in the FIA World Endurance Championship. He won the Autosport BRDC Award in 2018, for which he received a prize Formula One test with McLaren. Five years later, in 2023, Gamble joined McLaren as a factory driver.

He is the younger brother of George Gamble, also a racing driver in the British Touring Car Championship.

Racing record

Racing career summary 

† As Gamble was a guest driver, he was ineligible to score points.
* Season still in progress.

Complete BRDC British Formula 3 Championship results
(key) (Races in bold indicate pole position) (Races in italics indicate fastest lap)

Complete GT World Challenge Europe Sprint Cup results
(key) (Races in bold indicate pole position; results in italics indicate fastest lap)

Complete British GT Championship results
(key) (Races in bold indicate pole position) (Races in italics indicate fastest lap)

Complete European Le Mans Series results
(key) (Races in bold indicate pole position; results in italics indicate fastest lap)

Complete FIA World Endurance Championship results
(key) (Races in bold indicate pole position) (Races in italics indicate fastest lap)

Complete IMSA SportsCar Championship results
(key) (Races in bold indicate pole position; results in italics indicate fastest lap)

Complete 24 Hours of Le Mans results

References

External links 
 

Living people
2001 births
British racing drivers
Ginetta Junior Championship drivers
BRDC British Formula 3 Championship drivers
European Le Mans Series drivers
Asian Le Mans Series drivers
FIA World Endurance Championship drivers
24 Hours of Le Mans drivers
JHR Developments drivers
Fortec Motorsport drivers
W Racing Team drivers
Aston Martin Racing drivers
United Autosports drivers
WeatherTech SportsCar Championship drivers
Le Mans Cup drivers